Josh Holstein (born November 2, 2001) is an American politician serving as a member of the West Virginia House of Delegates from the 23rd district. Elected in November 2020, he assumed office on December 1, 2020.

Early life and education 
Holstein is a native of Ashford, West Virginia. He graduated from Sherman High School and is projected to earn a Bachelor of Arts degree in economics from Marshall University in 2021.

Career 
In 2018, Holstein was an intern in the United States House of Representatives. During the 2018 United States Senate elections, he worked as a voter registration coordinator for the West Virginia Republican Party. Holstein was a candidate for the West Virginia House of Delegates in 2020. He was featured in a Business Insider piece about young candidates for state legislatures. Holstein did not face an opponent in the Republican primary and defeated Democratic incumbent Rodney Miller in the November general election.

Political positions

Critical Race Theory
In 2021 Holstein spoke against Critical Race Theory and stated “I don’t want to see future West Virginians and future Americans growing up thinking that everyone is hateful, that everyone is looking to oppress others."

Abortion
In 2022, the West Virginia Legislature passed HB302 banned abortion in West Virginia with exceptions only for rape, incest, and the life of the mother. On September 13, 2022, Holstein joined 77 other members of the West Virginia House of Delegates by voting in favor of the bill. He was endorsed by West Virginians for Life during the 2020 and 2022 election cycles.

References 

Living people
2001 births
People from Boone County, West Virginia
Republican Party members of the West Virginia House of Delegates
21st-century American politicians